S. Balakrishnan may refer to:

 S. Balakrishnan (composer) (1948–2019), Indian film score composer and music director
 S. Balakrishnan (Mudukulathur MLA) (died 2006), Indian politician
 S. Balakrishnan (Modakurichi MLA), Indian politician